Saintongeais (saintonjhais) is a dialect of Poitevin-Santongeais spoken halfway down the western coast of France in the former provinces of Saintonge, Aunis and Angoumois, all of which have been incorporated into the current departments of Charente and Charente-Maritime as well as in parts of the neighbouring department of Gironde and a town in Dordogne. Although many of the same words are used in both Charente departments, they differ in what they mean or in how they are pronounced.

Saintongeais which is a langue d'oïl, and Gascon which is a langue d'oc variety have significantly influenced the Acadian and Cajun dialects of French spoken in Canada and the United States respectively.

Geographic distribution
Its area covers the entire department of Charente-Maritime (except the very north), the west and centre of the department of Charente, the northern department of Gironde with its Pays Gabaye and its enclaves around Saintonge, Monségur. Today, Saintongeais is no longer widely spoken except in the countryside. It is still used in shows, magazines, and radio. Some words from Saintongeais are still used in the region. Words like since (floorcloth) are so widespread that they are considered by some to be French.

Cultural distribution
Along with French, Saintongeais is used in the magazine Xaintonge, which is published twice a year. Country doctor Athanase Jean also wrote several plays in the dialect and helped promote the Saintonge culture.

References

External links

 Xaintonge
 A glossary of Saintongeais

Languages of France
Oïl languages